Postmodernity and Its Discontents is a book written by Zygmunt Bauman, published in 1997. It is considered a landmark in Bauman's studies on postmodernism. The title references Sigmund Freud's 1930 book Civilization and Its Discontents.

Overview

In his work, Bauman  references Sigmund Freud's 1930 book Civilization and Its Discontents in the title, which was concerned with repression.

He posits that a shift had taken place in modern society in the latter half of the 20th century. It had changed from a society of producers into a society of consumers. According to Bauman, this change reversed the "modern" tradeoff espoused by Freud in his Civilization and Its Discontents, that freedom was given up in exchange for security and order. In Bauman's view of the postmodern society,  the 'will to happiness' is a sacrificing of security. Security was given up in exchange for more freedom, freedom to purchase and consume with a sense of constant uncertainty. It establishes a new category of "strangers" who are excluded from society.
.

References

External links
Postmodernity and its Discontents: Wiley

1997 non-fiction books
Philosophy books
Sociology books
Books by Zygmunt Bauman